Arturo Peralta Miranda (born June 10, 1897;  died Lima, November 9, 1969) was a Peruvian writer, he had an active literary and political life in his country, mostly in his native city: Puno. Some say that at his time, he was one of the four major representatives of the Peruvian indigenous movement. He was known in the world of literature and journalism both in Peru and Bolivia under the pseudonyms "John Cajal", "P", "Gonzalez Saavedra," "The Man in The Street" and "Gamaliel Churata".
	
He arrived to Bolivia for the first time in 1917, exiled from his country for political reasons. After a short stay in La Paz, he stayed in Potosi, where developed an intense and fruitful literary work. He returned to Bolivia in 1932, after several political conflicts succeed in their country, this time to stay for more than thirty years in that country until 1964. In 1957 (La Paz), published "El Pez de Oro" (The Golden Fish), a mix of Andean myths with avant-garde narratives. He died in Lima on November 8, 1969.

Literary production
El pez de oro (1957)

External links
 Virtual Journal of Literature: El Hablador (Spanish)
 Gamaliel Churata. Interpelaciones al excepcionalismo de los saberes universales desde una concepción ambiciosamente crítica del pensamiento humano (Spanish). In: América Crítica international peer-reviewed, open access journal

Peruvian journalists
Male journalists
Peruvian male writers
1897 births
1969 deaths
20th-century journalists